Anne Migliosi (born 1965) is a Norwegian team handball player from Skien. She played for the club Gjerpen IF and made her debut on the national team in 1984. She won a bronze medal at the 1986 World Women's Handball Championship.

Migliosi played 62 matches and scored 70 goals for the Norwegian national handball team between 1984 and 1988.

References

External links

1965 births
Living people
Norwegian female handball players
Sportspeople from Skien